Andrés de Oviedo (1518 - 29 June 1577), also known as Andre da Oviedo, was a Spanish Jesuit missionary and Patriarch of Ethiopia.

Oviedo was born in Illescas, Toledo.  On 19 June 1541, while in Rome, he entered the Society of Jesus, nine months after it was approved by Pope Paul III. In autumn of that year he travelled to Paris, where he studied theology, although his studies were interrupted by the war between France and Spain, so he continued studying in Louvain, completing in 1544.

He was auxiliary of the Patriarch of Ethiopia João Nunes Barreto in the apostolic mission which began in 1556 under the sponsorship by John III of Portugal and Ignatius of Loyola. With the death of Nunes on 22 December 1562, he succeeded to the Patriarchate. Though the mission's purpose - reconciliation with the Church of Rome - failed, Oviedo remained till the end of his life in Fremona (Ethiopia), at the service of the small catholic community, where he died the 26 June 1577.

References
 Konrad Eubel (1923). Hierarchia catholica medii et recentioris aevi, vol. 3. Librariae Regensbergianae, Münster. .
 Ángel Santos Hernández (2001). Jesuitas y obispados: Los jesuitas obispos misioneros y los obispos jesuitas de la extinción, vol. 2. Universidad Pontificia Comillas, Madrid. .

1518 births
1577 deaths
Roman Catholic missionaries in Ethiopia
16th-century Spanish Jesuits
Spanish Roman Catholic missionaries
People from the Province of Toledo
16th-century Roman Catholic bishops in Africa
16th century in Ethiopia
Spanish expatriates in Ethiopia
Jesuit missionaries in Ethiopia
Ethiopian Catholic bishops